Ioannis Sismanis was a Hellenic Army general.

Born in Nafpaktia in 1859, he became an NCO and was commissioned as an officer following graduation from the NCO School. He fought in the Greco-Turkish War of 1897, the Balkan Wars of 1912–13, the Macedonian front of World War I (1917–18) and in the Greco-Turkish War of 1919–22 until his retirement from service on 10 September 1921 (O.S.) with the rank of Major General.

References

1859 births
20th-century deaths
Hellenic Army major generals
Greek military personnel of the Balkan Wars
Greek military personnel of the Greco-Turkish War (1897)
Greek military personnel of the Greco-Turkish War (1919–1922)
People from Nafpaktia